The Hank Aaron Award is given annually to the Major League Baseball (MLB) players selected as the top hitter in each league, as voted on by baseball fans and members of the media. It was introduced in 1999 to commemorate the 25th anniversary of Hank Aaron's surpassing of Babe Ruth's career home run mark of 714 home runs. The award was the first major award to be introduced by Major League Baseball in 19 years.

For the 1999 season, a winner was selected using an objective points system. Hits, home runs, and runs batted in (RBI) were given certain point values and the winner was the player who had the highest tabulated points total.

In 2000, the system was changed to a ballot in which each MLB team's radio and television play-by-play broadcasters and color analysts voted for three players in each league. Their first-place vote receives five points, the second-place vote receives three points, and the third-place vote receives one point. Beginning in 2003, fans were allowed to vote via MLB's official website, MLB.com. Fans' votes account for 30% of the points, while broadcasters' and analysts' votes account for the other 70%. 

The award is handed out to the winners of both leagues before Game 4 of the World Series (mostly after Game 2 due to travel to a different venue) each year, with Aaron himself presenting the awards until the 2019 World Series and his death in 2021 (except 2018 when it is handed out in Game 3 and 2019 when it is handed out in Game 2). The first winners of the award were Manny Ramirez and Sammy Sosa in 1999, while the most recent winners are Aaron Judge and Paul Goldschmidt. Alex Rodriguez won the award four times, the most of any player. The winner with the most hits was Todd Helton in 2000, Barry Bonds in 2001 had the most home runs, and Manny Ramírez in 1999 had the most RBIs. Players from the Boston Red Sox and Toronto Blue Jays have won the award five times, the most of any team.

Trophy
The Hank Aaron Award has a maritaca granite base and an antique bat and banner combination on the top. It weighs  and sits on a base of cherry wood.

Key

Winners

See also

 Silver Slugger Award: given to the best offensive player at each position.
 Edgar Martínez Award: given to the best-designated hitter (DH) (American League).
 Major League Baseball Triple Crown
 This Year in Baseball Awards (including hitter)
 Baseball awards
 List of Major League Baseball awards
 Ted Williams Museum and Hitters Hall of Fame (including "500 Homerun Club" exhibit)

References
General

 
 
 
 

Specific

Major League Baseball trophies and awards
Awards established in 1999
1999 establishments in the United States